Pterostylis stenochila, commonly known as the narrow-lip leafy greenhood, is a plant in the orchid family Orchidaceae and is endemic to Tasmania. Flowering plants have up to seven shiny, transparent green flowers with darker green stripes. The flowers have an insect-like labellum which is green with an emerald green stripe along its centre. Non-flowering plants have a rosette of leaves on a stalk, but flowering plants lack the rosette, instead having five or six stem leaves.

Description
Pterostylis stenochila, is a terrestrial,  perennial, deciduous, herb with an underground tuber. The dorsal sepal and petals are fused, forming a hood or "galea" over the column with the dorsal sepal having a short point on its tip. The petals have a wide, transparent flange on their outer edges. Flowering occurs from July to September.

Taxonomy and naming
Pterostylis stenochila was first formally described in 1998 by David Jones and the description was published in Muelleria from a specimen collected at Brooks Bay near Geeveston. The specific epithet (stenochila) is derived from the Ancient Greek words stenos meaning "narrow" and cheilos meaning "lip", referring to the narrow labellum.

Distribution and habitat

References

stenochila
Endemic orchids of Australia
Orchids of Tasmania
Plants described in 1998